Mateusz Sawrymowicz (born 22 April 1987 in Lublin) is a Polish swimmer who specializes in the 1500 m freestyle. Having won in Melbourne in 2007 he became the first person to beat Grant Hackett at the 1500 m in the World Championships for 10 years. Later in the year in Debrecen, he became the first person to beat Yury Prilukov in the European Short Course Championships for 5 years.

Sawrymowicz originally touched 4th at the 2012 World Short Course Championships in Istanbul, and was later awarded a bronze medal after the disqualification of Mads Glaesner, the gold medalist, for an anti-doping violation.

However, upon appeal to the Court of Arbitration for Sport, Glaesner's 1500-meter freestyle gold medal was reinstated based on the fact that a test after that race, two days after his initial positive test following the 400-meter free, was clean. He still forfeited the 400-meter freestyle bronze, which he did not appeal. This means that Sawrymowicz's official position was returned to 4th place in the 1500-meter freestyle.

References

External links
 

1987 births
Living people
Polish male freestyle swimmers
Sportspeople from Lublin
Olympic swimmers of Poland
Swimmers at the 2008 Summer Olympics
Swimmers at the 2012 Summer Olympics
Swimmers at the 2016 Summer Olympics
World Aquatics Championships medalists in swimming
Medalists at the FINA World Swimming Championships (25 m)
European Aquatics Championships medalists in swimming